Brachyolene capensis is a species of beetle in the family Cerambycidae. It was described by Stephan von Breuning in 1970. It is known from South Africa.

References

Tetraulaxini
Beetles described in 1970
Taxa named by Stephan von Breuning (entomologist)